Timber Creek, traditionally known as Makalamayi, is an isolated small town on the banks of the Victoria River in the Northern Territory of Australia. The Victoria Highway passes through the town, which is the only significant settlement between the Western Australia border and the town of Katherine to the east.

History

Pre-European history
The Ngaliwurru and Nungali peoples, two groups of Aboriginal Australian groups, are the original inhabitants and traditional owners of the lands surrounding the town. Their way of life remained unchanged for thousands of years until first contact with Europeans in the 19th century. The traditional name for the locality is "Makalamayi".

1855: European exploration
In September 1855, Augustus Charles Gregory and a party of 19 men reached the mouth of the Victoria River. The party's schooner, Tom Tough, proceeded along the river, landing near the present town of Timber Creek and a base camp for the expedition was established. Gregory named a nearby stream "Timber Creek" on 24 November while seeking timber to make repairs to the boat.

The scientific name of the boab, Adansonia gregorii, was named in honour of Gregory.

20th century development
A police station was constructed in 1898, and substantially upgraded in 1908 as river traffic grew to service pastoral properties being established in the area. In 1911, a depot was established to service the river trade. Historical records from the late 19th and early 20th century indicate there were ongoing tensions, and isolated incidents of violence between pastoralist and Aboriginal residents in the area at during this time.

During World War II growing concerns over a Japanese invasion of northern Australia led to the formation of the 2/1st North Australia Observer Unit, a highly mobile reconnaissance unit led by local Aboriginal guides who knew the local landscape. The role of this unit was to report any enemy landings on isolated areas of the coastline. The unit was active in the Timber Creek and Victoria River areas, recognised in 1998 with a memorial to the "Nackeroos" – the nickname for those who served with this unique unit – being constructed near the town.

Timber Creek was proclaimed a town on 20 June 1975.

In 1996, the Department of Defence purchased Bradshaw Station, a large cattle property in the vicinity of Timber Creek. This land subsequently became Bradshaw Field Training Area, an 8700 km2 live fire training facility. In 2002, the 270m long Bradshaw Bridge opened, providing road access to the training area from the Victoria Highway at Timber Creek.

1997: Griffiths decision
Ngaliwurru and Nungali lands surrounding Timber Creek were the subject of the landmark Griffiths decision in the High Court of Australia. The case (Griffiths v Minister for Lands, Planning and Environment) involved an appeal by the traditional owners, represented by Alan Griffiths and William Gulwin, against the Northern Territory Government's attempted sale in 1997 of vacant Crown land for the purposes of commercial development. In the course of doing so, the native title would be compulsorily acquired under the Lands Acquisition Act 1989 (NT) from the traditional owners by a government minister, for the commercial benefit of a private third party. Due to a change in government following the 2001 Northern Territory elections, the development did not proceed and the native title was not acquired, but the case proceeded in the courts.

The final decision handed down in 2008 found that the provisions under the Lands Acquisition Act meant the Minister could legitimately acquire land for any purpose, extinguishing native title and interests in the land granted under the Native Title Act (1993). By the time of the decision the Northern Territory Government had already changed the legislation to prevent this or future compulsory acquisition of lands subject to native title.

2022–2023: Tropical Cyclone Ellie

 Tropical Cyclone Ellie caused extensive flooding in Timber Creek, after it moved through the Northern Territory first from 22 December 2022, and then again after it crossed the border back into NT from Western Australia in early January. It was described as once-in-50-year flooding. Remote communities in the are had been cut off as roads remained closed. Victoria Daly Region Mayor Brian Pedwell said that better emergency procedures needed to be developed to help the community cope with future such disasters, after evacuees had to take shelter on a basketball court before being to a defence base.

Geography

Climate
Timber Creek is a tropical savanna climate (Köppen climate classification Aw) with distinct wet and dry seasons. The annual rainfall is 979mm with the heaviest falls occurring during the wet season months November – April. High humidity and overnight temperatures as well as large thunderstorms characterise this season. The Victoria River is prone to flooding during these months. The dry season months, May–October, see minimal rainfall, blue skies, less humidity and cooler overnight temperatures.

Demographics
There were 278 persons resident in Timber Creek at the 2021 census. This was an increase of 11.6% from the 249 residents reported at the 2016 census. 54.8% of the population was male and 45.2% female. 155 persons (56%) identified as Aboriginal or Torres Strait Islanders. The median age of residents was 33 years. 75% of the population was born in Australia. The most common languages spoken in the town were English and Ngaliwurru. Of those who reported a religious affiliation, the largest group was Pentecostal (22%). While median weekly incomes were lower for individuals than both the Northern Territory and national levels, household incomes were higher than the national median in Timber Creek.

Attractions

Judbarra / Gregory National Park encompasses  of wilderness, covering tropical and semi-arid landscapes. It is significant for the natural beauty and traces of Aboriginal culture throughout the park. It is open all year round for fishing, camping and four-wheel drive activities. The park was formerly known as Gregory National Park, but on 21 October 2011, it was announced that under a joint management plan with the traditional owners, the park would be dual-named "Judbarra / Gregory" for ten years. The plan aims to preserve the unique cultural heritage found at this place. In 2021, it will officially be known only as Judbarra National Park.

Gregory'sTree

"Gregory's Tree" is a large boab tree on which explorer A.C. Gregory party inscribed the arrival and departure dates of the 1855–56 expedition to explore the Victoria River and surrounds. The tree is located at the northernmost point of the Gregory National Park at the expedition's original campsite by the river bank and is a short drive from the Victoria Highway and is well signposted. The site itself has boardwalks and information signs detailing its history. The tree is registered both as a heritage place and an Aboriginal sacred site.

Timber Creek museum 

The 1908 police station building in the town is heritage listed and serves as a museum with local history and law enforcement exhibits. The main building was restored in the 1980s. The museum precinct includes outbuildings and grave sites. The buildings are maintained by the National Trust of Australia (Northern Territory).

Economy, infrastructure, and public services
Timber Creek has a clinic, the Timber Creek Health Centre, run by the Katherine West Health Board. The clinic is staffed Monday–Friday by a GP and four nurses. Specialist services are available through semi-regular visits to the clinic, which can dispense medications.

The Timber Creek School, the only school in the town, is a public primary and middle school catering for students from Transition to Year 9. As of August 2010, there were 59 students. The school employs five full-time teaching staff, as well as a support staff member; 96 per cent of the students are Aboriginal.

Timber Creek has an automated power station capable of generating 1MW for the community. The generator was installed in 2005 and is owned and operated by Power and Water Corporation.

Amenities in the present town include a roadhouse including a general store, petrol outlet, a hotel, caravan park, tourist information and shire offices for the Victoria Daly Shire Council. There is also a police station, a primary school for children from pre-school to middle years (Year 9), health clinic and an airstrip. The town is bordered to the north by the Bradshaw Training Area, and to the west by Gregory National Park.

Timber Creek Mechanical is situated 3 km out of Timber Creek on Wilson Street. The workshop is owned and operated by the Ngaliwurru-Wuli Aboriginal Corporation.

Timber Creek is a rest stop for interstate coach services on routes between Darwin and Perth or Broome. Buses stop at the roadhouse on the Victoria Highway.

There is an airstrip a few kilometres to the west of town, Timber Creek Airport. The single dirt runway provides a landing ground for medical evacuation and charter flights. During the wet season, flooding of the river can close the airport.

References

External links
 Victoria Daly Shire Council

Towns in the Northern Territory
Victoria Daly Region
Populated places established in 1898
1898 establishments in Australia